Onychostoma leptura is a species of cyprinid in the genus Onychostoma.

References

leptura
Cyprinid fish of Asia
Freshwater fish of China
Fish of Laos
Fish of Vietnam
Fish described in 1900